Vardan Zakaryan is a German amateur boxer of Armenian descent who competed at the 2000 Summer Olympics at Flyweight. Zakaryan was defeated in the first round by eventual Gold Medalist Wijan Ponlid.

References

Living people
Armenian male boxers
Flyweight boxers
Olympic boxers of Germany
Boxers at the 2000 Summer Olympics
German people of Armenian descent
German male boxers
Year of birth missing (living people)